Wintermusic / Bass Symphony No. 3 is an EP by Peter Frohmader, released in 1987 by Multimood.

Track listing

Personnel
Adapted from the Wintermusic / Bass Symphony No. 3 liner notes.
 Peter Frohmader – choir, Chapman Stick (A-side), fretless bass guitar (B-side), six-string bass guitar (B-side), eight-string bass guitar (B-side), photography
 Birgit Metzger – vocals

Release history

References

External links 
 Wintermusic / Bass Symphony No. 3 at Discogs (list of releases)

1987 EPs
Peter Frohmader albums